Albert Darasz (in Polish Wojciech Władysław Darasz, 25 November 1808, Warsaw, 19 August 1852, London) was a leading figure in the Polish National Liberation Movement.  He took part in the 1830-1831 insurrection in Poland. Darasz also belonged to the democratic group of Polish emigrants and was a member of the Central Committee of European Democracy.

He is buried on the western side of Highgate Cemetery.

References

External links 
 William James Linton (1812–97), From “A Threnody: In Memory of Albert Darasz”.

1808 births
1852 deaths
Burials at Highgate Cemetery
Polish revolutionaries